Deogarh Lok Sabha constituency was a Lok Sabha (parliamentary) constituency in Orissa state in eastern India till 2008. Assembly constituencies which constituted this parliamentary constituency were: Pallahara, Talcher, Brajarajnagar, Jharsuguda, Laikera, Kuchinda and Deogarh. After 2008, some of the constituencies went into Bargarh and some into Dhenkanal.

Members of Parliament

1952: Constituency does not exist
1957: Badakumar Pratap Gangadeb, GP (as Angul seat )
1962: Harekrushna Mahatab, Indian National Congress (as Angul seat )
1967: D. N. Deb, Swatantra Party (as Angul seat )
1971: Badakumar Pratap Gangadeb, Indian National Congress (as Angul seat )
1977: Pabitra Mohan Pradhan, Janata Party
1980: Narayan Sahu, Indian National Congress
1984: Sriballav Panigrahi, Indian National Congress
1989: Ravi Narayan Pani, Janata Dal
1991: Sriballav Panigrahi, Indian National Congress
1996: Sriballav Panigrahi, Indian National Congress
1998: Debendra Pradhan, Bharatiya Janata Party
1999: Debendra Pradhan, Bharatiya Janata Party
2004: Dharmendra Pradhan, Bharatiya Janata Party
2008 Onwards: Constituency does not exist

See also
 Debagarh district
 List of former constituencies of the Lok Sabha

References

Debagarh district
Former Lok Sabha constituencies of Odisha
Former constituencies of the Lok Sabha
2008 disestablishments in India
Constituencies disestablished in 2008